Kevin Pouya (born December 20, 1994), known mononymously as Pouya, is an American rapper from Miami, Florida. Considered as a pioneer of the early underground rap scene that began on SoundCloud in 2012, along with discovering the well known hip-hop duo Suicideboys in their early career, Pouya has developed a long lasting core fanbase as an independent artist.

Early life
As a teenager, Pouya and his best friend Nicholas Voutsinas (known professionally as "Fat Nick") had a YouTube comedy channel called NICK AND POUYA SHOW. While mostly being comedy sketches, the videos also served as mini vlogs for the friends. Travelling around the local neighborhoods in Miami, they would often feature other friends in the videos, including future rapper Denzel Curry and the group RVIDXR KLVN.

Pouya dropped out of high school in his sophomore year. He worked cleaning toilets at a restaurant for a year before finding success in music.

Career 
Pouya started rapping seriously around 2011, and after debuting a freestyle with local Florida rapper Nell titled Shotz From The Double Glock, began releasing music frequently. Again staying close with childhood friend Fat Nick, the two formed the Buffet Boys, a group that later became their record label. He gained notoriety after he released the song "Get Buck" in 2013, which as of June 2022 has over 13 million video views. On November 20, 2013, Pouya released a collaboration EP with The Cool Kids' Sir Michael Rocks titled Gookin'''. The two connected after Rocks had moved to Miami.

His fifth solo mixtape Stunna, would be released on March 5, 2014. Elevator Magazine would describe the mixtape as Bone Thugs-N-Harmony influenced, saying "he does a great job of molding their style into his own version with a twist of his own style thrown in there." His next mixtape would be released on March 25, 2015, entitled South Side Slugs. The mixtape would contain guest appearances from Sir Michael Rocks, Denzel Curry, SDotBraddy, Fat Nick, and new Buffet Boys member Germ. Pouya collaborated with Suicideboys on an EP titled $outh $ide $uicide, that was released on September 1, 2015.

In 2016, he released his debut studio album Underground Underdog under the Buffet Boys label. The album peaked at #156 on the Billboard 200. In 2017, he was a featured artist in the song "On Her Mind" by progressive metalcore band Volumes on their album Different Animals. That same year, he released a collaboration mixtape with Fat Nick titled Drop Out of School. In 2018 he released his second studio album, titled Five Five. On June 30, 2019, Pouya released his third studio album titled, The South Got Something to Say. The album included guest appearances from City Morgue, Juicy J and Ghostemane.

In December 2020, Pouya collaborated with Fat Nick to release Drop Out of School 2. Pouya's fourth studio album Blood Was Never Thick As Water was released on October 22, 2021. The title comes from a lyric in the closing song to the album, and features rapper Denzel Curry and singer Lu. In February 2022, he released the extended play dirt/hurt/pain/. It would be the last project by Pouya to be released under Buffet Boys.

In March 2022, Pouya along with other Buffet Boys members, announced that the label would be disbanding indefinitely. Not long after, they announced their new label All But 6 Records.

 Personal life 
Pouya is of Cuban and Persian heritage.

Pouya has been in a longtime relationship with internet personality and entrepreneur Courtney Neville (known professionally as "Young Baby Coco") since 2017.

 Discography 
 Studio albums 

 Extended plays 

 Baby Bone (2013)
 Gookin' (2013) (w/ Sir Michael Rocks)
 $outh $ide $uicide (2015) (w/ $uicideboy$)Pouya x Germ x Shakewell EP (2015) (w/ Germ & Shakewell)
 Pouya & Boobie Lootaveli: Greatest Hits, Vol. 1 (2020) (w/ Boobie Lootaveli)
 Drop Out of School 2 (2020) (w/ Fat Nick)
 Dirt/Hurt/Pain (2022)

 Mixtapes 

 Fuck It (2012)
 Don't Sleep On Me Hoe (2012)
 WarBucks (2013) (w/ SDotBraddy)
 Stunna (2014)
 South Side Slugs (2015)
 Drop Out of School (2017) (w/ Fat Nick)
 Pouya & Boobie Lootaveli: Greatest Hits, Vol. 3 (2019) (w/ Boobie Lootaveli)
 All But 6'' (2023) (w/ All But 6 & Fat Nick)

Singles

Guest appearances

References 

1994 births
Living people
American people of Cuban descent
American people of Iranian descent
American male rappers
Rappers from Miami
Hispanic and Latino American rappers